Frederick Ludwig Hoffman (May 2, 1865 Varel, Germany - February 23, 1946, San Diego, California) was an American statistician who showed great foresight on some public health issues, but his work in some areas was biased by his scientific racist views.

Biography
Hoffman was educated in the common and private schools in Germany. He was a racist against African Americans in his studies of incarceration. He moved to the United States and became statistician for the Prudential Insurance Company of America in 1891. He was employed as statistician by many organizations and did research in ethnology and kindred subjects. He also served as President of the American Statistical Association in 1911. A collection of his papers are held at the National Library of Medicine.

Works
 The Race Traits and Tendencies of the American Negro (1896) This book, Hoffman's first, characterized African Americans as exceptionally disease-prone. The work was motivated by a concern about issues of race, and also the need of insurance companies to justify the higher life insurance premiums charged to African Americans. An 1897 critique of this work by Kelly Miller in occasional papers of the American Negro Academy of Washington, D.C., pointed out sampling problems with the 1890 census, which was the statistical basis of the work, and that there were insufficient adjustments for environmental factors.
 Fatal Accidents in Coal Mining (1910)
 Mortality from Cancer Throughout the World (1915)
 Mortality from Respiratory Diseases in Dusty Trades (1917)

References

Sources

1865 births
1946 deaths
American statisticians
American white supremacists
German emigrants to the United States
Scientists from Lower Saxony
Presidents of the American Statistical Association